181 (one hundred [and] eighty-one) is the natural number following 180 and preceding 182.

In mathematics
 181 is an odd number
 181 is a centered number
 181 is a centered pentagonal number
 181 is a centered 12-gonal number
 181 is a centered 18-gonal number
 181 is a centered 30-gonal number
 181 is a centered square number
 181 is a star number that represents a centered hexagram (as in the game of Chinese checkers)
 181 is a deficient number, as 1 is less than 181
 181 is an odious number
 181 is a prime number
 181 is a Chen prime
 181 is a dihedral prime
 181 is a full reptend prime
 181 is a palindromic prime
 181 is a strobogrammatic prime, the same when viewed upside down
 181 is a twin prime with 179
 181 is a square-free number
 181 is an undulating number, if written in the ternary, the negaternary, or the nonary numeral systems
 181 is the difference of 2 square numbers: 912 – 902
 181 is the sum of 2 consecutive square numbers: 92 + 102
 181 is the sum of 5 consecutive prime numbers: 29  + 31  + 37  + 41  + 43

In geography
 Langenburg No. 181, Saskatchewan rural municipality in Saskatchewan, Canada
 181 Fremont Street proposed skyscraper in San Francisco, California
 181 West Madison Street, Chicago

In the military
 181st (Brandon) Battalion, CEF was a unit in the Canadian Expeditionary Force during World War I
 181st Airlift Squadron is a unit of the Texas Air National Guard
 181st Infantry Brigade of the United States Army based at Fort McCoy, Wisconsin
 181st Intelligence Wing is a unit of the United States Air Force located at Hulman Field, Terre Haute, Indiana
 AN/APQ-181 an all-weather, low probability of intercept (LPI) radar system for the U.S. Air Force B-2A Spirit bomber aircraft
 Bücker Bü 181 Bestmann single-engine trainer aircraft during World War II
  was a ship scheduled to be acquired by the United States Navy, however, the program was cancelled
  was a United States Navy troop transport during World War II
  was a United States Navy oiler following the Vietnam War
  was a United States Navy ATA-174-class auxiliary ocean tugboat during World War II
  was a United States Navy Alamosa-class cargo ship following World War II
  was a United States Navy  following World War I
  was a United States Navy Porpoise-class submarine during World War II 
  was a United States Navy  during World War II

In movies

 “181: Fragments of a Journey in Palestine-Israel,” winner of the 2005 Yamagata International Documentary Film Festival
 The war film “The Enemy Below” revolves around the fictitious , USS Hayes (DE-181) and a German U-boat

In transportation
 The Volkswagen 181
 Lufthansa Flight 181, which was hijacked on October 13, 1977
 London Buses route 181
 181 Union City-New York, a New Jersey Transit bus route from New Jersey to New York
 The Córas Iompair Éireann CIE 181 Class diesel locomotives, and numbered B181 to B192, built by General Motors Electro-Motive Division (EMD) in 1966
 East 181st Avenue, a light rail station on the MAX Blue Line in Gresham, Oregon
 New York City Subway stations in Manhattan:
 181st Street (IND Eighth Avenue Line), at Fort Washington Avenue served by the 
 181st Street (IRT Broadway – Seventh Avenue Line), at St. Nicholas Avenue served by the 
 181st Street (Manhattan)
 Oregon Route 229, also known as the Siletz Highway No. 181

In other fields
181 is also:
 The year AD 181 or 181 BC
 The atomic number of an element temporarily called Unoctunium
 181 Eucharis is a large K-type Main belt asteroid
 Minuscule 181 (in the Gregory-Aland numbering), α 101 (Soden), is a Greek minuscule manuscript of the New Testament
 Mir-181 microRNA precursor is a small non-coding RNA molecule
The number of channels on a “cable-ready” American television set, with 68 over-the-air television channels (12 VHF channels [2 through 13] and 56 UHF channels [14 through 69]) and 113 cable television channels (channel 1 and channels 14 through 125, excluding VHF channels 2 through 13)

See also
 List of highways numbered 181
 United Nations Security Council Resolution 181
 United Nations General Assembly Resolution 181 (II) Future Government of Palestine
 United States Supreme Court cases, Volume 181
 Pennsylvania House of Representatives, District 181
 Criminal Code of Belarus, Article 181
 Constitution of Malaysia, Article 181

References

External links

 Number Facts and Trivia: 181
 The Number 181
 The Positive Integer 181
 Prime curiosities: 181
 VirtueScience: 181
 Number Gossip: 181
 181 FM Internet radio

Integers